Zamira Shamiliyevna Amirova (born 11 June 1979) is a retired Uzbekistani middle-distance runner, born in Tashkent, who specialized in the 800 metres. Her personal best time is 2:02.30 minutes, achieved in June 2002 in Tashkent.

Achievements

References
 

1979 births
Living people
Sportspeople from Tashkent
Uzbekistani female middle-distance runners
Athletes (track and field) at the 2000 Summer Olympics
Athletes (track and field) at the 2004 Summer Olympics
Olympic athletes of Uzbekistan
Asian Games medalists in athletics (track and field)
Athletes (track and field) at the 2002 Asian Games
Athletes (track and field) at the 2006 Asian Games
Uzbekistani female cross country runners
Asian Games bronze medalists for Uzbekistan
Medalists at the 2002 Asian Games
Medalists at the 2006 Asian Games
20th-century Uzbekistani women
21st-century Uzbekistani women